Herbert Seton Stewart Kyle  (29 August 1873 – 5 January 1955) was a member of the Reform Party and since 1936 National Party Member of Parliament in New Zealand.

Early life and profession
Kyle was born in Brunswick, Melbourne, Australia, in 1873. He received his education from The Geelong College and the Melbourne Veterinary College. He was a vet in Ballarat until 1899, when he migrated to New Zealand.

He was a New Zealand government vet in Christchurch from 1901 to 1918.
Afterwards, he had his private practice in Christchurch.

Member of Parliament

George Witty was successful, with Kyle coming second and Jack McCullough coming third. Kyle won the Riccarton electorate in the 1925 election, and held it to 1943 when he was defeated (he withdrew).

Independent
Kyle resigned from the National Party in 1942. He stated: 
"The National Party organization has built up a watertight compartment that makes one become a 'yes man' with expulsion as an alternative". Kyle thought it "better to retire from the party than to place on it the onus of expulsion, a point which the gentleman (Sid Holland) who moved the resolution was expounding when I left the caucus meeting". Kyle remained an Independent until 1943, but did not contest the election in that year.

In 1935, Kyle was awarded the King George V Silver Jubilee Medal. He was appointed an Officer of the Order of the British Empire, for public and local government services, in the 1953 New Year Honours.

Death
Kyle died on 5 January 1955, and was buried in Bromley Cemetery.

Notes

References

1873 births
1955 deaths
Burials at Bromley Cemetery
Independent MPs of New Zealand
New Zealand farmers
New Zealand MPs for Christchurch electorates
New Zealand National Party MPs
Reform Party (New Zealand) MPs
New Zealand Officers of the Order of the British Empire
Australian emigrants to New Zealand
Members of the New Zealand House of Representatives
New Zealand veterinarians
Unsuccessful candidates in the 1922 New Zealand general election
People educated at Geelong College
Chancellors of Lincoln University (New Zealand)
People from Brunswick, Victoria